Waboda is a Papuan language of southern Papua New Guinea. In Kiwai Rural LLG, it is spoken in Dameratamu, Gesoa, Kabaturi, Maduduo, Meipani, Sagero, Tirere, and Wapi villages.

References

External links 
 Paradisec has a collection of Stephen A Wurm's materials (SAW3) that include Waboda materials.

Kiwaian languages
Languages of Western Province (Papua New Guinea)